Ulyanovsky District is an administrative and municipal district (raion), one of the twenty-four in Kaluga Oblast, Russia. It is located in the south of the oblast. Its administrative center is the rural locality (a selo) of Ulyanovo. Population:  8,870 (2002 Census);  The population of Ulyanovo accounts for 43.6% of the district's total population.

References

Notes

Sources

Districts of Kaluga Oblast